The 19th World Cup season began in December 1984 in Italy and concluded in March 1985 in the United States.  The overall champions were Marc Girardelli of Luxembourg and Michela Figini of Switzerland; both were first-time champions.

A break in the schedule was for the 1985 World Championships, held in Bormio, northern Italy between January 31 and February 10, 1985.  These were the first world championships held in an odd-numbered year.  This was also the last year that Super G was included as part of the giant slalom discipline; beginning with the next season, Super G was treated as a separate discipline.

Calendar

Men

Ladies

Men

Overall 

see complete table

In Men's Overall World Cup 1984/85 the best five downhills, best five giant slaloms/Super G, best five slaloms and best three combined count. 27 racers had a point deduction.

Downhill 

see complete table

Giant Slalom / Super G 

see complete table

In Men's Giant Slalom and Super G World Cup 1984/85 the best 5 results count. Steven Lee and Daniel Mahrer shared the win in a strange race at Furano due to weather changes.

Slalom 

see complete table

In Men's Slalom World Cup 1984/85 the best 5 results count. Marc Girardelli won seven races (five in a row) and won the cup with maximum points.

Combined 

see complete table

In Men's Combined World Cup 1984/85 all 5 results count.

Ladies

Overall 

see complete table

In Women's Overall World Cup 1984/85 the best four downhills, best four giant slaloms/Super G, best four slaloms and best three combined count. 31 racers had a point deduction.

Downhill 

see complete table

In Women's Downhill World Cup 1984/85 the best five results count.

Giant Slalom / Super G 

see complete table

Marina Kiehl and Michela Figini each finished with 110 points and each won three races during the year, so the second tiebreak (best sixth result) needed to be used, which awarded the discipline victory to Kiehl (15 points to 8).

Slalom 

see complete table

In Women's Slalom World Cup 1984/85 the best 5 results count. Erika Hess won her fourth Slalom World Cup.

Combined 

see complete table

In Women's Combined World Cup 1984/85 all 4 results count. All four events were won by athletes from Switzerland.

Nations Cup

Overall

Men

Ladies

References

External links
FIS-ski.com - World Cup standings - 1985

FIS Alpine Ski World Cup
World Cup
World Cup